Roman Bondarenko (born 14 August 1966) is a former Turkmenistani international footballer.

Club career
For most of his career he played as striker for Torpedo Zaporizhia, later Metalurh.

International career
Roman Bondarenko played for Turkmenistan national team at the 1998 Asian Games in Thailand in 1998.

Personal life
He has a twin brother Oleksandr who is also a football player, and a son, Taras, as well a footballer.

References

External links
Player profile 
New Turkmen went to Thailand

1966 births
Living people
Footballers from Zaporizhzhia
Turkmenistan footballers
Ukrainian footballers
Soviet footballers
Turkmenistan people of Ukrainian descent
Turkmenistan international footballers
Ukrainian Premier League players
FC Metalurh Zaporizhzhia players
FC Torpedo Zaporizhzhia players
Ukrainian twins
Twin sportspeople
Footballers at the 1998 Asian Games
Association football forwards
Asian Games competitors for Turkmenistan